The 2016 Carrom World Championship, was the 7th edition of an international Carrom tournament governed by the International Carrom Federation, contested from 7 to 11 November 2016 in Birmingham, United Kingdom. Fifteen countries had competed in the tournament.

Indian and Sri Lankan players would be defending their titles in the Men's, Women's and Doubles categories.

This edition was considered to be the largest so far with over 15 countries participating in the elite event including the likes of USA, Germany, Canada, France and Italy.

Participating Teams 
Each team can have a maximum of four men and four women, who can compete in the individual singles and doubles, apart from team event and Swiss league competition.

The entry fee for each player will be $250.

The host will take care of boarding, lodging and transport expenses of all the teams.

Total 15 countries participated in this event.

Men's

Women's

Medals

Nations

  (7) (Host)
  (8)
  (4)
  (4)
  (7)  
  (8)
  (4)
  (6)
  (4)
  (8)
  (8)
  (8)
  (4)
  (8)
  (4)

Results

Men's Singles 
First Place: Prashant More 

Second Place: Riyaz Akbarali 

Third Place: Yogesh Pardesi 

Fourth Place: R.M. Shankara - India

Fifth PLACE : D.N. Fernando - Sri Lanka

Sixth Place : Louis Fernandes - Canada

Seventh Place : Chamil Cooray - Sri Lanka

Eighth Place : Sandeep Deoroukar - India

Men's Doubles 
First Place: Sandeep Deorukhkar / Riyaz Akbar

Second Place: R. M. Shankara / S.P. Aravinthan

Men's Team 
First Place: 

Second Place: 

Third Place:

Women's Singles 
First Place: S. Appoorwa 

Second Place: Parimala Devi 

Third Place: Rashmi Kumari

Women's Doubles 
First Place: Kajol Kumari and S. Appoorwa 

Second Place Parimala Devi and Tuba Sheher

Women's Team 
First Place: 

Second Place: 

Third Place:

Swiss League

References 

Carrom